Biston perclara is a moth of the family Geometridae. It is found in Taiwan and Japan.

References

Moths described in 1899
Bistonini